Costellariidae sometimes called the "ribbed miters" is a taxonomic family of minute to medium-sized predatory sea snails, marine gastropod mollusks. 
This family of snails is also sometimes referred to as Vexillum miters. The main family of miter shells however is Mitridae, a closely related group.

The monophyly of this family has been confirmed.

Taxonomy 
This family was previously sometimes known as Vexillidae.

Latiromitra (from family Ptychatractidae) has been found to be closely related to Costellariidae in the molecular phylogeny analysis by Fedosov & Kantor (2010).

Genera
Genera within the family Costellariidae include:
 Alisimitra Fedosov, Herrmann & Bouchet, 2017
 Atlantilux S.-I Huang, 2015
 Austromitra Finlay, 1927
 Ceratoxancus Kuroda, 1952
 Costapex Fedosov, Herrmann & Bouchet, 2017
 Latiromitra Locard, 1897
 Mitromica S. S. Berry, 1958
 Nodicostellaria Petuch, 1987
 Orphanopusia Fedosov, Herrmann & Bouchet, 2017
 Protoelongata Herrmann, Stossier & R. Salisbury, 2014
 Pusia Swainson, 1840 - It is either a distinct genus or a subgenus of Vexillum
 Suluspira Fedosov, Herrmann & Bouchet, 2017
 Thala H. Adams & A. Adams, 1853
 Thaluta Rosenberg & Callomon, 2003
 Tosapusia Azuma, 1965
 Turricostellaria Petuch, 1987
 Turriplicifer Fedosov, Marrow, Herrmann & Bouchet, 2017
 Vexillum Röding, 1798 - synonym: Turricula Fabricius, 1823 non Schumacher, 1817

synonyms:
 Costellaria Swainson, 1840: synonym of Vexillum Röding, 1798
 Pusiolina Cossmann, 1921 is a synonym of Microvoluta
 Turricula H. Adams & A. Adams, 1853 (not to be confounded with Turricula Schumacher, 1817) : synonym of  Vexillum Röding, 1798
 Visaya Poppe, Guillot de Suduiraut & Tagaro, 2006: synonym of Suluspira Fedosov, Herrmann & Bouchet, 2017 (invalid: junior homonym of Visaya Ahyong, 2004; Suluspira is a replacement name)
 Zierliana Gray, 1847: synonym of Vexillum Röding, 1798

Ecology 
carnivorous.

References

External links 
 Fedosov A.E., Puillandre N., Herrmann M., Dgebuadze P. & Bouchet P. (2017). Phylogeny, systematics, and evolution of the family Costellariidae (Gastropoda: Neogastropoda). Zoological Journal of the Linnean Society. 179(3): 541-626

 
Gastropod families